Dayesi Maso Casales (born 4 April 1990) is a retired Cuban volleyball player. She was part of the Cuba women's national volleyball team.

She participated at the 2010 FIVB Volleyball Women's World Championship in Japan. She played with Camagüey.

Clubs
  Camagüey (2010)

References

External links
 FIVB Profile
 

1990 births
Living people
Cuban women's volleyball players
Place of birth missing (living people)